Dokuzdeğirmen can refer to:

 Dokuzdeğirmen, Cumayeri
 Dokuzdeğirmen, Oltu